Mercer Township may refer to:

 Mercer Township, Mercer County, Illinois
 Mercer Township, Adams County, Iowa
 Mercer Township, McLean County, North Dakota, in McLean County, North Dakota
 Mercer Township, Butler County, Pennsylvania

Township name disambiguation pages